HMS M33 is an  of the Royal Navy built in 1915. She saw active service in the Mediterranean during the First World War and in Russia during the Allied Intervention in 1919. She was used subsequently as a mine-laying training ship, fuelling hulk, boom defence workshop and floating office, being renamed HMS Minerva and Hulk C23 during her long life. She passed to Hampshire County Council in the 1980s and was then handed over to the National Museum of the Royal Navy in 2014. A programme  of conservation was undertaken to enable her to be opened to the public. HMS M33 is located within Portsmouth Historic Dockyard and opened to visitors on 7 August 2015 following a service of dedication. She is one of only three surviving Royal Navy warships of the First World War and the only surviving Allied ship from the Gallipoli Campaign, the other being the Ottoman minelayer Nusret, preserved in Çanakkale.

Construction
M33 was built as part of the rapid ship construction campaign following the outbreak of the First World War by Harland and Wolff, Belfast. Ordered in March 1915, she was launched in May and commissioned in June; an impressive shipbuilding feat, especially considering that numerous other ships of her type were being built in the same period.

First World War
Armed with a pair of  guns and having a shallow draught, M33 was designed for coastal bombardment. Commanded by Lieutenant Commander Preston-Thomas, her first active operation was the support of the British landings at Suvla during the Battle of Gallipoli in August 1915. She remained stationed at Gallipoli until the evacuation in January 1916. For the remainder of the war she served in the Mediterranean and was involved in the seizure of the Greek fleet at Salamis Bay on 1 September 1916.

Russia
M33 next saw service, along with five other monitors (and ), which were sent to Murmansk in 1919 to relieve the North Russian Expeditionary Force.  In June, M33 moved to Archangel and her shallow draught enabled her to travel up the Dvina River to cover the withdrawal of British and White Russian forces. At one time the river level was so low the ship's guns had to be removed and transported by cart. M25 and M27 were not so fortunate and had to be scuttled on 16 September 1919 after running aground. M33 safely returned to Chatham in October.

Harbour service and restoration
In 1925 M33 became a mine-laying training ship and was renamed HMS Minerva on 3 February 1925. She went through a number of roles for the remainder of her career including fuelling hulk and boom defence workshop. Her name was changed again in 1939, this time to Hulk C23. In 1946 she became a floating office at the Royal Clarence Victualling Yard at Gosport. Put up for sale in 1984, she eventually passed to Hampshire County Council. She was opened to the public for the first time as part of the National Museum of the Royal Navy on 7 August 2015.

References

Bibliography

External links 

Monitor M33 - Hampshire County Council
Monitor M33 - History
National Historic Ships Committee listing for M33
 HMS M33 - National Museum of the Royal Navy

 

M29-class monitors
Ships built in Belfast
1915 ships
Museum ships in the United Kingdom
Royal Navy ship names
World War I monitors of the United Kingdom
Ships and vessels of the National Historic Fleet